Latorre is a surname. Notable people with the surname include:

 Claudio Latorre, Chilean soccer player
 Diego Latorre, Argentine soccer player
 Javier Latorre, Spanish dancer
 Juan Carlos Latorre, Chilean politician
 Juan José Latorre, Chilean vice admiral
 Lorenzo Latorre, president of Uruguay
 Mariano Latorre, Chilean writer
 Roxana Latorre, Argentine senator
 Tyler LaTorre, American baseball catcher
 Xavier Diaz-Latorre, Spanish musician

See also
 Chilean ship Almirante Latorre